Mirco Petrella (born 30 July 1993) is an Italian professional footballer who plays as a winger for  club Ancona-Matelica.

Club career
Formed in Delfino Pescara youth sector, Petrella made his professional debut for Teramo in 2012.

On 10 August 2017, he signed for Triestina.

In 2019, he joined Südtirol, and played 23 matches in Serie C.

On 9 August 2020, he left Südtirol and returned to Triestina.

On 27 June 2022, Petrella signed a two-year contract with Ancona-Matelica.

References

External links
 
 

1993 births
Living people
Sportspeople from the Province of L'Aquila
Footballers from Abruzzo
Italian footballers
Association football wingers
Serie C players
Serie D players
Delfino Pescara 1936 players
S.S. Teramo Calcio players
U.S. Triestina Calcio 1918 players
F.C. Südtirol players
Ancona-Matelica players